Schoorldam (West Frisian: Skorledam) is a hamlet in the Dutch province of North Holland. It is partially in the municipality of Bergen, and partially in the municipality of Schagen.

The hamlet was first mentioned in 1569 as Schoorldam, and means "dam (in the Rekere river) near Schoorl".

References 

Schagen
Populated places in North Holland
Bergen, North Holland